The Association des Guides du Togo (AGT, Guides Association of Togo) is the national Guiding organization of Togo. It serves 2,495 members (as of 2003). Founded in 1942, the girls-only organization became a full member of the World Association of Girl Guides and Girl Scouts in 1963.

See also
Association Scoute du Togo

References

World Association of Girl Guides and Girl Scouts member organizations
Scouting and Guiding in Togo

Youth organizations established in 1942